This list presents individuals prior to the beginning of contemporary history (which began after World War II) and gathers published estimates of their (inflation-adjusted) net worth. 

For the period after the Industrial Revolution, wealth can be measured more or less objectively via inflation adjustment. For the periods of history before that, comparison of wealth becomes more problematic, principally due to the inaccuracy or unreliability of records, and also due to the difficulty of comparing a pre-industrial economy to a modern one, and especially in the presence of an absolute monarchy, where an entire kingdom or empire is considered the ruler's personal property. 

Excluding monarchs and autocrats, the wealthiest private individuals in the history of capitalism are variously identified as Jakob Fugger, who was of the early modern Fugger family of merchants and bankers, prominent figures of India's Delhi Sultanate, Bengal Sultanate and the Mughal Empire and early-20th-century American entrepreneurs Andrew Carnegie and John D. Rockefeller.

While the Rothschild family rose to the status of the wealthiest family of bankers in the 19th century, their wealth was distributed among a number of family members, preventing them from appearing among the wealthiest of individuals. The richest among the Rothschilds was the head of its English branch—Nathan Mayer Rothschild—the richest person of his time. Bernstein and Swan in All the Money in the World (2008) mention the top four richest Americans ever—all tycoons of the Gilded Age—respectively: John D. Rockefeller, Andrew Carnegie, Cornelius Vanderbilt, and William Henry Vanderbilt. Henry Ford was ranked only the 12th.

According to Close (2016), the wealthiest woman in the history of capitalism, excluding monarchs, was L'Oréal heiress Liliane Bettencourt, whose net worth was $40.7 billion in 2015. Including monarchs, he mentions Wu Zetian for antiquity, Razia Sultana and Isabella I of Castile for the Middle Ages, and Catherine the Great for modern history.

Private individuals

Post-antiquity heads of state 
Absolute rulers or conquerors are sometimes listed for the territory they controlled rather than for their immediate personal wealth. Davidson (2015) for TIME.com listed the four Mughal emperors (Akbar, Jahangir, Shah Jahan and Aurangzeb) and their ancestors Genghis Khan and Timur as being the wealthiest historical figures based on their imperial possessions, while Alan Rufus is listed as one of the wealthiest historical figures for his immediate possessions within the feudal system of Norman England.

Antiquity 
For classical antiquity, even more than for the High Middle Ages, the definition of personal wealth becomes difficult to compare with the modern period; especially in the case of divine kings such as the pharaohs and Roman emperors, where an entire empire might be considered the personal property of a deified emperor.

See also 
 The World's Billionaires, an annual ranking of billionaires by Forbes
 List of richest Americans in history
 List of wealthiest religious organizations
 List of wealthiest families
 List of wealthiest animals

References

General bibliography

Further reading 
 Philip Beresford, William D. Rubinstein, The Richest of the Rich: The Wealthiest 250 People in Britain since 1066, Harriman House, 2011, .
 Michael Klepper, Robert Gunther, The Wealthy 100: From Benjamin Franklin to Bill Gates—A Ranking of the Richest Americans, Past and Present, Citadel Press, 1996, .
 Rich & Richer-Fifty of the Wealthiest People of the Past 1,000 Years

External links
 THE 10 RICHEST PEOPLE OF ALL TIME - Money article
 The 20 Richest People Of All Time - businessinsider.com article

Wealthiest historical figures
Wealthiest historical figures
Historical figures